The Malaysian Cricket Association is the official governing body of the sport of cricket in Malaysia. Its current headquarters is in Kuala Lumpur, Malaysia. The Malaysian Cricket Association is Malaysia's representative at the International Cricket Council, having been an associate member the ICC since 1967. It is also a member of the Asian Cricket Council.

References

External links
Official site of Malaysian Cricket Association

Cricket administration
Cricket
Cricket in Malaysia